Pandeism is a religious construct incorporating elements of pantheism and deism.

Pandeism may also refer to:
Pandeism (Godfrey Higgins), a secret cult hypothesized by several eighteenth century religionists
Pandeism has occasionally been used as a synonym for Omnism, a philosophy which deems all religions to be equal paths to the truth

See also
Pande
Pandey